Seamus Robinson (born 1 April 1975 in Melbourne, Australia) was the first Australian fencer to win a Fencing World Championship title when he won the men's épée cadets (under 17) title in 1991, Foggia, Italy and to place third on the junior men's épée world cup in 1995.

Other results include:
2003 World Cup : Cuba - 6th 
2003 World Cup : Tehran - 7th 
2003 World Championships:Cuba -12th 
2004 World Cup: Innsbruck - 11th 
2004 World Cup : Puerto Rico -9th

Robinson competed at the 2004 Summer Olympics in Athens, losing in the second round to eventual bronze medal winner Pavel Kolobkov.

References

1975 births
Living people
Australian male fencers
Fencers at the 2004 Summer Olympics
Olympic fencers of Australia
Sportspeople from Melbourne